Jebi Mather is a politician and social activist hailing from Kerala state in India. She is currently a Member of Parliament in the Rajya Sabha, the upper house of the Indian Parliament, representing Kerala state. She is the current President of Kerala Pradesh Mahila Congress, a regional branch of All India Mahila Congress She is a Committee Member of Indian National Congress. She has been elected unopposed as Member of Parliament to the Rajya Sabha on 4 April 2022.

Positions held
Jebi has held the following positions;

References

External links
 

Living people
Indian National Congress politicians
Malayali politicians
People from Ernakulam district
1978 births